Tara Mae Thornton is a fictional character in Charlaine Harris's The Southern Vampire Mysteries and their television adaptation, HBO's True Blood.

Profile

Tara Mae Thornton is a twenty-something Louisiana native and lifelong friend of the main protagonist, Sookie Stackhouse.

The books establish that Tara's parents were abusive alcoholics. The television show also expands Tara's family to include the spared Lafayette Reynolds and his mother, Ruby Jean Reynolds.

The Southern Vampire Mysteries
Tara has two siblings, a brother and a sister. They both left Bon Temps and Tara behind as soon as they were able to. In Living Dead in Dallas, Tara is engaged to "Eggs" Benedict Talley, but this relationship ends when a secret sex party they attend that ends badly. She then opens up a clothing store called Tara's Togs, and briefly dates the vampire Franklin Mott. He soon dumps her and gives her to the vampire Mickey who turns out to be a sadist. The situation with Mickey gets so bad that Sookie and the vampire Eric Northman must take action to rescue her.

After owning and operating her own business for a few years, Tara becomes ready to settle down. During the events of All Together Dead, she and JB du Rone elope. Tara is currently pregnant with JB's twins. She confides this to Sookie, telling her that she did not plan on having a baby, but felt she should try her best and be the great mother that she herself never had. It is Claude who reveals that Tara is having twins, a boy and a girl. She later gives birth to a daughter named Sara Sookie and a son named Robert Thornton with help from Sookie. She and JB go through some financial problems after the birth of the twins and JB decides to work as a stripper at Hooligans, a bar owned by Sookie's fairy cousin Claude, to great annoyance of Tara. After Dead Ever After Tara and JB divorce. Tara became very successful in her business and even opened up a series of clothing stores.

True Blood

In the HBO series True Blood, Tara is portrayed by actress Rutina Wesley. Actress Brook Kerr was originally cast in the role, but she was replaced after the pilot episode., she first appeared in the BloodCopy.com video “Maxine & Tara Thornton interview”.

Seasons 1 and 2
In the beginning of the television show, Tara lives with her mother Lettie Mae, who is described as an alcoholic turned fundamentalist who brings nothing but misery to Tara's life. As a child Tara would run to Sookie's house to get away from her mother's beatings. It is because of this and the fact that Tara's acceptance of Sookie as a telepath that the two became best friends. Despite enduring years of abuse, neglect, and disappointment from her mother, Tara still cares deeply about Lettie Mae's well-being, however, Tara is a very angry and wounded individual.

Tara leaves her mother's house and moves into Lafayette's home. The discovery of a hidden web cam in his bathroom results in her moving out and into her own apartment. After her mother undergoes an exorcism, Tara briefly moves back in with her, but then Tara is arrested for DUI, so Lettie Mae kicks Tara back out. Tara is later bailed out by the mysterious "social worker" Maryann Forrester, and she takes up residence at Maryann's luxurious estate.

Tara and Sam Merlotte, who is Tara's boss, explore the possibilities of a romantic relationship, but it never establishes. Before they can give it another try, Tara meets "Eggs" Benedict Talley, who also lives with Maryann. Sensing that something is not quite right with the mysterious lady, Tara resists the temptation to live with them permanently and moves in with Sookie. However, Sookie goes to Dallas and leaves Tara alone. A vulnerable Tara succumbs to the draw of Maryann and Eggs, but instead of moving in with them, Tara invites the pair to move into Sookie's. Tara and Eggs use this opportunity to get to know each other, and Tara even falls in love with him despite his questionable past. The relationship ends when Eggs is killed by Jason Stackhouse.

Seasons 3 and 4
Tara then crosses paths with the sociopathic vampire Franklin Mott. Franklin glamours and bites her, kidnaps her and holds her bound in a bathroom and takes her to the Mississippi mansion of Russell Edgington. Franklin mixes romantic talk and the prospect of turning her into a vampire with coercive actions, while Tara attempts to soothe him with compliant words, while plotting her own escape. She escapes him on her second attempt, and makes it back to Bon Temps, where she seeks help in a rape survivors' group. Franklin confronts her once more in the parking lot of Merlotte's Bar and Grill a few nights later and attempts to kidnap her again. Tara is saved when Jason Stackhouse arrives and kills Franklin.

Jason, the object of Tara's affection since she was a little girl, takes her back to his house to recover. They kiss, but then Jason confesses to being the one who shot Eggs. Tara leaves his place and goes back to Merlotte's where she finds a very angry-at-the-world Sam. The two end up spending another night together, and in the morning, Tara feels a little less frayed around the edges. The feeling does not last, however, as Sam decides to reveal his shape-shifting secret to her. She leaves his house and goes back to her mother's house where she finds Lettie Mae in an intimate situation with the Reverend Daniels. It is all too much for Tara, and she leaves Bon Temps for New Orleans, where she changes her first name to "Toni" and finds work as an MMA-style cage fighter. Tara has also started a lesbian relationship with another female fighter, Naomi. But Tara eventually returns to Bon Temps and, through her association with the medium Marnie Stonebrook, becomes entangled in the vampires' battle against necromancy. Shortly afterward she is seen pushing Sookie out of the way of a shotgun blast from the gun of Debbie Pelt, but the buckshot hits her in the side and back of the head and neck.

Seasons 5, 6, and 7
After being shot and left for dead, Tara is turned into a vampire by Pamela Swynford De Beaufort at the request of Lafayette and Sookie. She subsequently attacks Lafayette and Sookie upon awaking, holding resentment that the only people she loved would turn her into her worst nightmare. Pam gives her work at Fangtasia first as a bartender, and later as a dancer. As the fifth season progresses Tara becomes more comfortable with her new life, befriends fellow baby vampire Jessica Hamby, and begins to develop romantic feelings for Pam. During Eric Northman and Bill Compton's involvement with the Vampire Authority, Tara assists in the murder of vampire sheriff Elijah Stormer. Pam is arrested by the Authority and held captive, being freed when Tara joins Eric, Jason, Sookie, and Nora Gainesborough in the infiltration of the Authority's headquarters. Upon reuniting, Tara and Pam share a passionate kiss.

Tara and Pam are then captured and held in the vampire prison camps, created by Louisiana governor Truman Burrell as part of the state's efforts to control the vampire population. She becomes friends with Willa Burrell, the governor's daughter who was turned by Eric. The group later escapes when Bill breaks into the camp and feeds the vampires his faerie-infused blood, which allows them to (albeit briefly) walk in sunlight.

Tara is killed by another vampire in Episode 1 of Season 7.

Throughout season 7 Tara appears to her mother who is under the influence of vampire blood, trying to tell her something about their past. In episode 8 it is revealed Tara had an abusive father who left after a fight with Lettie Mae. During the fight a young Tara pulls out her father's gun and almost shoots him but decides to bury it in the yard, resulting in his departure. In the end Tara and Lettie Mae make peace one last time. Tara asks her mother to forgive herself and then "let her go". They share a tearful hug and Tara moves on to the afterlife, but not before looking back at her mother one last time.

Bibliography 

The character Tara Thornton appears in the following:

 Living Dead in Dallas (March 2002)
 Club Dead (May 2003)
 Dead to the World (May 2004, hardcover , 2005, paperback )
 "Fairy Dust" from Powers of Detection (October 2004)
 "One Word Answer" from Bite (2005)
 Dead as a Doornail (May 2005, hardcover , April 2006, audio book , paperback )
 Definitely Dead (May 2006, hardcover , audio book )
 All Together Dead (May 2007, hardcover )
 "Dracula Night" from Many Bloody Returns (September 2007, hardcover )
 From Dead to Worse (May 2008, hardcover )
 Dead in the Family (May 2010, hardcover )

References 

Female characters in literature
American female characters in television
Fictional waiting staff
Fictional African-American people
Fictional bartenders
Fictional characters from Louisiana
Fictional bisexual females
Fictional vampires
Fictional characters with superhuman strength
Fictional characters with accelerated healing
Fictional characters who can move at superhuman speeds
Literary characters introduced in 2002
The Southern Vampire Mysteries characters
Fictional victims of domestic abuse
Fictional victims of sexual assault